Lloyd Michael Warren (born March 5, 1946) is a retired American television actor and former college basketball player, best known for playing Officer Bobby Hill on the NBC television series Hill Street Blues.

Early life
Warren was born and raised in South Bend, Indiana, the son of Ellen and Grayson Warren. He attended Central High School, where as a senior he was class president. He was twice named to the Indiana all-state team. He graduated in 1964 as Bears' career, season, and single-game scoring leader. In 1992, he was inducted into the Indiana Basketball Hall of Fame.

College basketball career

Warren played college basketball at UCLA, where he was a three-year varsity letterman and starting guard from 1966-68. Led by Lew Alcindor, the Bruins posted records of 30–0 in 1967 and 29–1 in 1968. Both teams, coached by legendary coach John Wooden, captured the NCAA national championship. He was named to the NCAA All-Tournament team and was an All-American in 1968, one of three on that UCLA team along with Alcindor and guard Lucius Allen. The team is considered one of the best in college basketball history. Warren also earned the award as the Bruins' best defender in 1966, and he won the award as the Bruins' best "team player" in 1967 and 1968.

Alcindor and Warren later crossed paths when Warren was an extra in the hospital flashback scene in the 1980 feature film Airplane!. Warren was inducted into the UCLA Athletics Hall of Fame.

Acting career
Warren would go on to work as an actor in television. In addition to his starring role on Hill Street Blues, he had an earlier role on The White Shadow, a co-starring role on the CBS series City of Angels, a recurring role on the Showtime series Soul Food, and as a guest star as Jason on Marcus Welby, M.D.

He appeared as basketball player Easly in Drive, He Said (1971), directed by Jack Nicholson. In 1974, he played the role of park ranger P. J. Lewis on the NBC adventure series Sierra, and went on to play a rookie officer for a possible backdoor pilot during the final 1975 season of Adam-12. His film work includes Norman... Is That You? (1976) with Redd Foxx and Pearl Bailey. In 1979, he starred as police officer Willie Miller on the CBS crime drama Paris, the first effort by Hill Street Blues executive producer Steven Bochco.

He guest starred in In the House opposite LL Cool J as Debbie Allen's ex-husband. He also guest starred on the Fox sitcom Living Single as Khadijah's father, and later portrayed Joan's father on the UPN/CW sitcom Girlfriends.

Warren played Darrin Dewitt Henson's boss on the Showtime show Soul Food, in which he played hustler-turned-entrepreneur Baron Marks. He had a recurring role on the ABC Family series Lincoln Heights as Spencer Sutton, Eddie's father.

He played Pete Bancroft in the Tales from the Darkside episode, "Satanic Piano" (1985). Warren appeared as Virgil Tibbs' former longtime police partner, Matthew Pogue on the episode of In the Heat of the Night "The Hammer and the Glove" in 1988. 

In 1996, he was on the Early Edition episode Hoops. He played Wells in the Sliders episode (5/8) "Java Jive" (1999).

In 2001, he played Officer William Henderson in an episode of TV series The District, entitled "The Project". In 2002, he appeared in "Normal Again", an episode of Buffy the Vampire Slayer, as a psychiatrist trying to convince Buffy Summers she is delusional.

In 2010, Warren appeared in the independent film Anderson's Cross playing the father of the lead character Nick Anderson.

Personal life
In 1974, Warren married Sue Narramore, with whom he had a daughter, Kekoa Brianna "Koa" Warren, and a son, Cash Garner Warren. After his first marriage ended in divorce, Warren married Jenny Palacios, with whom he also had a daughter, Makayla, and a son, Grayson Andres. Through Cash, Warren is the father-in-law of American actress Jessica Alba.

Honors
 USBWA All-America (1968)
 First-team All-AAWU (1968)
 Second-team All-AAWU (1966, 1967)
 2009 Pac-10 Hall of Honor inductee
 UCLA Athletic Hall of Fame (1990)
 14th round pick in the 1968 NBA draft

References

Sources
NCAA, NCAA March Madness: Cinderellas, Superstars, and Champions from the NCAA Men's Final Four. Chicago. Triumph Books, 2004.

External links

1946 births
Living people
African-American male actors
African-American basketball players
All-American college men's basketball players
American male television actors
Basketball players from South Bend, Indiana
Los Angeles Stars draft picks
Male actors from Indiana
Seattle SuperSonics draft picks
UCLA Bruins men's basketball players
American men's basketball players
21st-century African-American people
20th-century African-American sportspeople